Robert Poulot (born 5 July 1941) is a French racing cyclist. He rode in the 1964 Tour de France, earning 47th place overall and performing best in the 9th stage (Monaco), receiving 19th place. Earlier that season, he received 1st place in the Tour des Crombrailles. His professional seasons were 1964, 1965, and 1966.

References

1941 births
Living people
French male cyclists
Place of birth missing (living people)